Mount Macbeth is a  glacier-clad peak located in the Garibaldi Ranges of the Coast Mountains, in Garibaldi Provincial Park of southwestern British Columbia, Canada. It is part of the Spearhead Range, which is a subset of the Garibaldi Ranges. The Naden Glacier spreads out below the eastern aspect of the summit, the Macbeth Glacier lies below the south aspect, and the Curtain Glacier descends the northern slope. Precipitation runoff from the peak and meltwater from its glaciers drains into Fitzsimmons Creek which is a tributary of the Cheakamus River. Macbeth is most often climbed as part of the Spearhead Traverse. The first ascent of the mountain was made in 1969 by P. Starr, E. Bass, B. Ellis, and P. Macec via the northeast ridge. The peak was named in 1964 by an Alpine Club of Canada climbing party, to commemorate the 400th anniversary of William Shakespeare's birth. The mountain's name was officially adopted on August 27, 1965, by the Geographical Names Board of Canada.

Climate

Based on the Köppen climate classification, Mount Macbeth is located in the marine west coast climate zone of western North America. Most weather fronts originate in the Pacific Ocean, and travel east toward the Coast Mountains where they are forced upward by the range (Orographic lift), causing them to drop their moisture in the form of rain or snowfall. As a result, the Coast Mountains experience high precipitation, especially during the winter months in the form of snowfall. Winter temperatures can drop below −20 °C with wind chill factors below −30 °C. The months July through September offer the most favorable weather for climbing Mount Macbeth.

Climbing Routes
Established climbing routes on Mount Macbeth:
   
 Northeast Ridge -  First Ascent 1969
 East Side - standard route on snow
 Southwest Face
 South Face

See also

 Geography of British Columbia
 Geology of British Columbia

References

External links
 Weather: Mountain Forecast
 Mt. Macbeth photo: Flickr

Garibaldi Ranges
Two-thousanders of British Columbia
Sea-to-Sky Corridor
New Westminster Land District